William Waddell (7 March 1921 – 14 October 1992) was a professional football player and manager. His only club in a 16-year career as a player in the outside right position (interrupted by World War II) was Rangers which yielded six major winner's medals, and he also played 18 times for Scotland.

Waddell also managed Rangers – leading them to their only continental trophy in the 1972 European Cup Winners' Cup Final – and served as a director of the Glasgow club, after a spell in charge of Kilmarnock which culminated in their only Scottish league title in 1964–65, followed by some years working as a sports journalist.

Career

Playing career
Waddell was born in Forth, Lanarkshire. 
As a player, he only played professionally for Rangers in a career spanning both sides of World War II (and including over 200 unofficial matches during the conflict in addition to 317 recognised appearances).

He made his debut at the age of 17 in a friendly match against Arsenal and went on to win four League titles and two Scottish Cups as well as playing a large part in other successful cup runs without playing in the finals, and being a member of the Gers team which dominated the wartime competitions.

He also earned 18 caps for Scotland (scoring six times) between 1946 and 1954 after playing in eight unofficial wartime matches, and was selected for the Scottish League XI five times.

Managerial career
Waddell became manager of Kilmarnock in 1957. In what was their most prosperous era, the club achieved four runners-up placings in the league under his guidance between 1960 and 1964 and reached three finals (1959–60 Scottish Cup, 1961 League Cup, 1963 League Cup), all of which were lost.

Kilmarnock's efforts were finally rewarded with a trophy when the club won their only league championship to date, in 1964–65; this was achieved with a final day victory against their nearest rivals Heart of Midlothian. On leaving Kilmarnock in 1965 Waddell traded the football world for journalism, becoming a sportswriter for the Evening Citizen and Scottish Daily Express. He took charge of Kilmarnock in 389 competitive matches, winning 215 (55%), the club's best-ever ratio for a manager.

From the mid-1960s Scottish football was dominated by the Celtic side managed by Jock Stein. In 1969 Waddell returned to Rangers as manager, following the sacking of Davie White. The team did not win any League Championships with Waddell as manager, but won the Scottish League Cup in 1971, ending a run of six years without a trophy. In 1972 Waddell led Rangers to a European Cup Winners' Cup win, beating Dynamo Moscow 3–2 in the final in Barcelona. Later in 1972 he handed the management reins to his assistant, Jock Wallace, Jr. having been Rangers boss for 134 games.

Later career
Waddell went on to serve Rangers in general manager and vice chairman roles. During Waddell's time as manager, Rangers had suffered the 1971 Ibrox disaster, when 66 fans lost their lives. Waddell was credited with the reconstruction of Ibrox Stadium in the late 1970s and early 1980s, which made it one of the most modern grounds in Europe at the time of his death. He became general manager in 1972, after leaving his role as first-team manager, and latterly took up the role of vice chairman in September 1975. After four years he resigned his position, to be replaced by Lawrence Marlborough, and took up the role of consultant at the club. However, he left this role on 27 June 1981, after Rangers decided not to renew his £15,000-a-year (equivalent to £52,000 in 2015) contract but remained a director of the club until his death.

Career statistics

International appearances

International goals
Scores and results list Scotland's goal tally first.

Managerial record

Honours

Playing

Rangers

 Scottish League Championship: 1938–39, 1946–47, 1948–49, 1952–53
 Scottish Cup: 1948–49, 1952–53

Managerial

Kilmarnock

 Scottish League Championship: 1964–65

Rangers

 Scottish League Cup: 1970–71
 UEFA Cup Winners' Cup: 1971–72

References

External links

Waddell's profile at Rangers' Hall of Fame

1921 births
1992 deaths
Footballers from South Lanarkshire
Association football wingers
Kilmarnock F.C. managers
Rangers F.C. managers
Rangers F.C. players
Scotland international footballers
Scotland wartime international footballers
Scottish Football League players
Scottish football managers
Scottish footballers
Scottish Football Hall of Fame inductees
Scottish Football League representative players
Scottish Football League managers
Scottish Junior Football Association players
Forth Wanderers F.C. players
Strathclyde F.C. players